The Estonian Practical Shooting Association, Estonian Eesti Practical-laskmise Ühing, is the Estonian association for practical shooting under the International Practical Shooting Confederation.

References

External links
Official website

Regions of the International Practical Shooting Confederation
Practical Shooting